Champions League is a sports competition, typically association football, that is contested by club teams who have distinguished themselves in their respective national competitions. The name originated with, and most often refers to, the UEFA Champions League. It may also refer to:

Association football and futsal

Association football

Men's
 UEFA Champions League, an annual European competition for men's football clubs
 "Champions League" or UEFA Champions League Anthem, the official song of the competition
 CONCACAF Champions League, an annual North American, Central American, and Caribbean competition for men's football clubs
 AFC Champions League, an annual Asian competition for men's football clubs
 CAF Champions League, an annual African competition for men's football clubs
 OFC Champions League, an annual Oceanian competition for men's football clubs

Women's
 UEFA Women's Champions League, an annual European competition for women's football clubs
 CAF Women's Champions League, an annual African competition for women's football clubs

Futsal
 UEFA Futsal Champions League, an annual European competition for men's futsal clubs

Other sports
 CEV Champions League, the annual top official competition for volleyball clubs in Europe
 CEV Women's Champions League, an annual competition for women's volleyball clubs in Europe
 CERH European League, an annual competition for roller hockey clubs in Europe, known as Champions League between 1997 and 2005
 EHF Champions League, an annual competition for handball clubs in Europe
 Women's EHF Champions League, an annual competition for women's handball clubs in Europe
 WNBA-NBC Champions League (men), an annual competition for men's nine-pin bowling clubs in Europe
 WNBA-NBC Champions League (women), an annual competition for women's nine-pin bowling clubs in Europe
 European Champions League (table tennis), an annual competition for table tennis clubs in Europe
 Champions Hockey League, an annual competition for ice hockey clubs in Europe, launched in the 2014–15 season
 Champions Hockey League (2008–09), a short-lived competition for ice hockey clubs in Europe
 Champions League of Darts, a darts competition, launched in 2016
 LEN Champions League, an annual competition for water polo clubs in Europe
 Basketball Champions League, an annual European-wide professional club basketball competition

 Champions League Twenty20, an annual competition for domestic cricket teams from Australia, England, India, South Africa, West Indies, New Zealand and Sri Lanka
 Collegiate Champions League, an annual competition for an amateur basketball league in the Philippines

See also
 Championship League, a professional snooker tournament
 Championship League Darts, a professional darts tournament
 League of Champions, a super hero team based in San Francisco and published by Heroic Publishing